Wincenty Kasprzycki (born 1802, died May 27, 1849 in Warsaw) was a Polish painter, and lithographer.

Wincenty Kasprzycki studied in Warsaw and Vilnius. He specialised in landscape paintings and vedute inter alia of Warsaw, Wilanów, Natolin, Morysin, Gucin, and the Powązki Cemetery. Many of his notable works such as the Portraits of the Puchałów (Portrety małżeństwa Puchałów) are characterised with staffages. He has also painted the interiors of buildings, such as the Fine Arts Exhibition in Warsaw in 1828 (Widok Wystawy Sztuk Pięknych w Warszawie w 1828 roku). His paintings are located at the Museum of King John III's Palace in Warsaw, Poznań, and Lwów. He mainly lithographed portraits. His great grandson Wincenty Kasprzycki (1906-1965) was a sculptor.

References

External links

1802 births
1849 deaths
19th-century Polish painters
19th-century Polish male artists
Polish male painters
Polish lithographers